Lawrence McGrew (July 23, 1957 – April 2, 2004 ) was an American football linebacker in the National Football League (NFL).

College career
Lawrence McGrew played football at Contra Costa College and the University of Southern California, and started in two Rose Bowls. During the first round of the 1980 NFL Draft, he was selected by the New England Patriots as an outside linebacker.

Professional career
McGrew played for the National Football League New England Patriots and New York Giants between 1980 and 1990.
He helped New England reach the Super Bowl in 1986 and earned a championship ring when New York beat Buffalo in Super Bowl XXV.

Super Bowl XX
An excellent linebacker and relentless defender, McGrew will forever be remembered for a play he didn't make that occurred during Super Bowl XX between the New England Patriots and Chicago Bears in 1986. One of the most famous plays in Super Bowl history was William "The Refrigerator" Perry's touchdown run. McGrew was on the receiving end of the hit that propelled Perry into the end zone and into Super Bowl history. McGrew was no match for Perry's momentum and wide girth and was consequently run over and flattened by Perry in the end zone. When Lawrence didn't get up immediately after the play a teammate came over and asked him if he was okay. Lawrence replied "Yeah, I'm fine. But I just made ESPN highlights for eternity."

Death
Lawrence McGrew died on April 2, 2004. He was 46.

McGrew collapsed at his home in Lancaster, California, due to a massive heart attack. McGrew left his two children and one step-child by his wife Charyce McGrew – celsea, camynn and charyce Searcy – and three children Larry, Aaron, Analeise, granddaughter Lawryn, a grandson Nehamiah by a previous marriage to Elaine McGrew; who currently resides in El Sobrante, California.

Identity theft
A Colorado thief named Frederick William McGrew III used Larry McGrew's name and career statistics to get a job as an assistant football coach at Gavilan College in California. The impostor was discovered five weeks later, fired and arrested; he told police he was Lawrence's nephew and repeated the claim at his initial court appearance, but it was discovered to be a lie.

In December 1999, Frederick McGrew was sentenced to three years of supervised probation and 160 hours of community service for stealing Lawrence's identity and for fraudulently using an Ohio woman's Social Security number.

Frederick McGrew also falsely worked under the NFL star's name while working as a cook in a TGI Friday's restaurant in Salt Lake City, UT during the late 1990s, and even told at least one restaurant employee "I was the player who William "The Refrigerator" Perry ran over in the end zone to score a touchdown in Super Bowl XX."

It is unknown if TGI Friday's management was ever made aware of this fraud, or if their tax/payroll records were ever corrected.

References

1957 births
2004 deaths
American football linebackers
USC Trojans football players
New England Patriots players
New York Giants players
People from Lancaster, California